Volkswagen Group of America, Inc. (sometimes referred to as Volkswagen of America, abbreviated to VWoA), is the North American operational headquarters, and subsidiary of the Volkswagen Group of automobile companies of Germany. VWoA is responsible for five marques: Audi, Bentley, Bugatti, Lamborghini, and Volkswagen cars.  It also controls VW Credit, Inc. (or VCI), Volkswagen's financial services and credit operations. The company is headquartered in unincorporated Fairfax County, Virginia, near Herndon.

In Germany, the parent company Volkswagen AG is responsible for eight marques of the group, from six European countries: Volkswagen, Audi, Bentley, Bugatti, Lamborghini, Porsche, SEAT, Škoda and Volkswagen Commercial Vehicles.

As of March 2008, VWoA has 20 operational facilities, spanning coast to coast, and its primary objective is ''"to offer attractive, safe and environmentally sound vehicles which are competitive on an increasingly tough market and which set world standards in their respective classes".

On July 16, 2008, Volkswagen AG announced plans to build its first production facility in the United States since the closure of its Westmoreland Assembly Plant in 1988. The Volkswagen Chattanooga Assembly Plant was inaugurated on May 24, 2011, and currently builds the US-spec Volkswagen Passat and in 2017 started production of the Volkswagen Atlas.

History

Foundation
Formed in October 1955 in Englewood Cliffs, New Jersey, to standardize dealership service in the United States, it grew to 909 Volkswagen dealers in the US by 1965 under the leadership of Dr. Carl Hahn. Under him and his successor as president of Volkswagen of America, J. Stuart Perkins, VW's U.S. sales grew to 569,696 cars in 1970, an all-time peak, when Volkswagen captured 7 percent of the U.S. car market and had over a thousand American dealerships.  The Volkswagen Beetle was the company's best seller in the United States by a wide margin.

From then on, however, intense competition from American and Japanese automakers caused VW sales in America to fall as much as 87 percent between 1970 and 1992, despite the introduction of new front-drive models in 1975 to replace the Beetle and its rear-engined, air-cooled stablemates.  As a result, the number of dealerships in the U.S. was also reduced to 630 by the mid-1990s.  As of 2007, there were 596 operating Volkswagen dealerships in the country.

Westmoreland and Auburn Hills
VWoA inaugurated the Volkswagen Westmoreland Assembly Plant near New Stanton, Pennsylvania, in 1978. This was the first modern venture by a foreign automaker at making cars in the United States. In 1988, the plant was closed. In the early 1980s, the manufacturing division and the sales division were merged, and Volkswagen of America moved to Troy, Michigan, as a result, settling in Auburn Hills, Michigan, in 1991.

1990s uncertainties
Volkswagen of America's sales hit rock bottom in 1993, with fewer than 50,000 cars sold that year. Sales began to recover the following year with the introduction of the third generation of the Golf and Jetta.  By the end of the decade, thanks to effective advertising and the launch of more competitive new products, including the New Beetle in 1998, the VW brand was back on firmer ground.  Volkswagen of America went on to sell 355,648 cars in 2001, its best year since 1973.

2000s
In the 2000s sales tapered off somewhat due to competition, quality issues and delays in product introductions, and VW's U.S. sales for 2005 totaled 224,195 – a reduction of about 37 percent from four years earlier.  New models for the 2006 and 2007 model years, such as the Passat, Rabbit, and GTI resulted in a sales growth of 4.9% for 2006 with sales of 235,140 vehicles.  Profitability still remained an issue, though; Volkswagen of America had not turned a profit for its parent company since 2002.  In January 2007, Volkswagen of America president Adrian Hallmark publicly stated that he planned to get the subsidiary back to profitability in two to three years.  He hoped to introduce new models for North America, and develop new marketing to encompass the whole brand as well as individual cars.  Stefan Jacoby soon replaced him, and Volkswagen of America continued to look at new products to add to its lineup.

In the meantime, a new advertising agency, Crispin Porter + Bogusky, helped rejuvenate VW's presence in the U.S. as well.  Its ads for the fifth-generation GTI have sparked interest in the brand, not seen since the launch of the New Beetle, and ads for the fifth-generation Golf/Rabbit hatchback translated into initial strong sales for that model.  Due to new air pollution rules promulgated by the United States Environmental Protection Agency (USEPA), the diesel powered VWs with TDI-PD technology could no longer be produced after December 31, 2006.  For the 2009 model year, VW introduced a new generation of diesels, based on common rail technology.  These would meet air pollution standards in all 50 states. The first of these units was made available for sale in August 2008. VW sold 2050 Jetta Sedan TDIs and 361 Jetta Sportwagen TDIs that first month. Volkswagen was later charged with three felonies and fined $25 billion for defrauding the American government when it was discovered that their vehicles were only passing laboratory emissions testing due to company tampering of their system's internal software.

In October 2009, Interpublic Group's Deutsch, Los Angeles, the ad agency of renowned ad man Donny Deutsch, won Volkswagen's American advertising account - fourteen years after Deutsch had tried for VW's advertising business against Arnold Advertising.

New headquarters in Virginia
On September 6, 2007, Volkswagen of America announced it would relocate its North American headquarters to Herndon, Virginia.  Volkswagen sales are particularly strong in the Mid-Atlantic region, as well as both coasts.  The company indicated that it is important for them to locate in a region where their customer base is strongest.  Presently, the Big Three domestic brands dominate the Midwest US, especially Metro Detroit where the company was formerly located.

Volkswagen of America began its move from Auburn Hills to Herndon in April 2008.  The company anticipated that 600 of the 1,400 staff would remain at Auburn Hills in the call center and technical services positions, while 400 jobs would transferred to Virginia.  About 150 employees in Michigan were expected to move to Herndon, Volkswagen of America President and CEO Stefan Jacoby said.  The four hundred remaining jobs were to be cut.

The state of Virginia, among 14 locations that Volkswagen of America considered for the move, offered Volkswagen $6 million in incentives that will be awarded pending Volkswagen's fulfillment of employment and other various quotas.

New manufacturing plant
On July 15, 2008, after an intense, months-long battle between Huntsville, Alabama, a site in Michigan and Chattanooga, Tennessee, the company's supervisory board chose Chattanooga as the location for the new plant.  This $1 billion investment was expected to result in production of about 150,000 cars a year by its slated opening in 2011, playing a major role in the company's strategy to gain more than 6% of the car market, or about 800,000 cars on top of the 230,000 it produced in America in 2007, by 2018. This plant also became Volkswagen Group of America's manufacturing headquarters in the U.S. The plant was inaugurated on May 24, 2011.

Current US facilities
As of March 2018, Volkswagen Group of America has the following 20 "Operational Facilities" across the US:
Auburn Hills, Michigan – Customer Relations and After Sales Support Center, Information Technology & Services
Herndon, Virginia – Corporate Headquarters
Hillsboro, Oregon – VW Credit, Inc. Center
Belmont, California – Electronics Research Laboratory (ERL)
Oxnard, California – Technical Center
Ontario, California – Parts Distribution Center
San Diego, California – Port/PPC
Maricopa, Arizona – Proving Ground
Golden, Colorado – VW Credit, Inc. and Technical Center
Fort Worth, Texas – Parts Distribution Center
Houston, Texas – Port/PPC and Parts Distribution Center
Libertyville, Illinois – VW Credit, Inc. Center
Pleasant Prairie, Wisconsin – Parts Distribution Center
Jacksonville, Florida – Parts Distribution Center
Brunswick, Georgia – Port/PPC
Cranbury, New Jersey – Parts Distribution Center
Allendale, New Jersey – Technical Center
Englewood Cliffs, New Jersey – Product Liaison
Davisville, Rhode Island – Port/PPC
Chattanooga, Tennessee – Volkswagen Chattanooga Assembly Plant
Woodcliff Lake, New Jersey – Northeast Region Office
Rosemont, Illinois – Midwest Region Office
Irving, Texas – South Central Region Office
Alpharetta, Georgia – Southeast Region Office
Westlake Village, California – Pacific Region Office

Regional offices

 VW Canada Head Office - Ajax, Ontario
 Volkswagen Finance Canada - Saint-Laurent, Quebec

Brands

Volkswagen

Current models
The following is a list of the models currently available in the American market:

Sales

The total number of new vehicle sales year-by-year in the U.S. market is as follows:

Audi

Current Audi models
The following is a list of the Audi models currently available in the American market:
A3 Sedan
A4 Sedan and allroad
A5 Coupe, Cabriolet and Sportback
A6 Sedan and allroad
A7 Sportback
A8 Sedan
Q3 SUV
Q4 e-tron SUV and Sportback
Q5 SUV and Sportback
Q7 SUV
Q8 SUV
TT Coupe and Roadster
S3 Sedan
S4 Sedan
S5 Coupe, Cabriolet and Sportback
S6 Sedan
S7 Sportback
S8 Sedan
SQ5 SUV and Sportback
SQ7 SUV
SQ8 SUV
TTS Coupe
e-tron GT
e-tron SUV and Sportback

Audi Sport models
The following is a list of Audi Sport currently available in the American market:
RS 3 Sedan
RS 5 Coupe and Sportback
RS 6 Avant
RS 7 Sportback
RS e-tron GT
RS Q8 SUV
TT RS Coupe
R8 Coupe and Spyder

Sales

Bentley

Current models
The following is a list of the models currently available in the American market:
Flying Spur
Continental GT Coupe
Continental GT Convertible
Bentayga

Lamborghini

Current models
The following is a list of the models currently available in the American market:
Huracán
Aventador
Urus

Bugatti

The only vehicle sold new under the Bugatti label is the Chiron.

See also

list of German cars
Volkswagen Group
Volkswagen Group China
Volkswagen do Brasil

References

External links
VolkswagenGroupAmerica.com corporate site
VW.com Volkswagen of America
AudiUSA.com Audi of America
BentleyMotors.com international site
Bugatti.com international site
Lamborghini.com international site

America
Car manufacturers of the United States
American subsidiaries of foreign companies
Companies based in Bergen County, New Jersey
Companies based in Fairfax County, Virginia
Herndon, Virginia
Conglomerate companies established in 1955
Vehicle manufacturing companies established in 1955
American companies established in 1955